The surname Kushner is an English-based transliteration of the Yiddish name קושנער, a variant of קושניר (Kushnir), an occupational name stemming from קירזשנער (kirzshner), a furrier. This is related to the German word Kürschner and the Ukrainian word кушнір (kushnir), with the same meaning.

People
Notable people with the surname include:

 Alexander Kushner, Russian poet
 Bernard Kouchner, French politician and physician
 Boris Kushner, mathematician, poet, and essayist
 Burton J. Kushner, ophthalmologist
 Dave Kushner, U.S. guitarist
 David Kushner, writer
 David Howard Kushner, American gynecologist-obstetrician and infertility specialist
 Donald Kushner, American film producer
 Ellen Kushner, U.S. fantasy author
 Eva Kushner,  Canadian scholar
 Eva Bella Kushner, American child actress and voice actress
 Harold (Samuel) Kushner, Conservative rabbi and author
 Harold J. Kushner, U.S. applied mathematics professor at Brown University
 Lawrence Kushner, Reform rabbi and author
 Rachel Kushner, U.S. author
 Tony Kushner, U.S. playwright
 Yvonne Levy Kushner, American actress and fundraiser

Kushner-Berkowitz-Trump American real estate family
 Kushner family
 Joseph Kushner (né: Berkowitz), founder of the Kushner real-estate mogul family
 Charles Kushner, real estate mogul, son of Joseph and Rae
 Jared Kushner, senior White House official and husband of Ivanka Trump, son of Charles, son-in-law of President Donald Trump
 Ivanka Trump Kushner, wife of Jared, daughter of President Donald Trump and Ivanna Trump
 Arabella Kushner, daughter of Jared and Ivanka
 Joshua Kushner, businessman, son of Charles
 Murray Kushner, real estate mogul, son of Joseph and Rae
 Marc Kushner, architect, son of Murray

See also 
 Kushnir (Ukrainian form)
 Kouchner (French form)
 Kürschner (German form)

Jewish surnames